Nicholas I, Lord of Werle ( – 14 May 1277), was Lord of Rostock from 1229 to 1234 and Lord of Werle from 1234 until his death.

In the division of Mecklenburg of 1234, he received the Lordship of Werle.  He was regent of Rostock for his younger brother Henry Borwin III, until his brother came of age.

He waged war together with Duke Barnim I of Pomerania against the Margraviate of Brandenburg and lost Perleberg, Wesenberg and Penzlin.  However, after the death of his brother Pribislaw I, he managed to secure Parchim, Plau and Goldberg for himself.  In 1275, he arbitrated in a conflict between his sons.

He strongly supported the founding of cities in its territory.  He saw this as a way to develop the land.

He died in 1277.  After his death, his sons divided Werle between themselves.

Marriage and issue 
He married around 1231 with Jutta, the daughter of Count Henry I of Anhalt.  They had the following children:
 Unnamed daughter, married around 1284 to Conrad I of Gützkow, reeve of Salzwedel
 Another daughter, married Lord Albert I of Mecklenburg
 Bernard I, Lord of Werle
 Hedwig (d. 1287), married Margrave John II of Brandenburg
 Henry I, Lord of Werle-Güstrow
 John I, Lord of Werle-Parchim
 Margareta (b. aft. 1231 - d. bef. 27 May 1261), second wife of Barnim I, Duke of Pomerania

External links 
 Genealogical table of the House of Mecklenburg

House of Mecklenburg
Lords of Rostock
Lords of Werle
13th-century births
1277 deaths
Year of birth uncertain
13th-century German nobility